Bayshore may refer to:

Communities 
Canada:
Bayshore, Ottawa, Ontario

United States:
Bayshore, neighborhood in the Upper Eastside of the city of Miami, Florida
Bayshore (Miami Beach), Florida, a neighborhood
Bayshore Gardens, Florida, census-designated place
Bayshore, North Carolina, census-designated place
Bayshore, Oregon, census-designated place
The Raritan Bayshore region in New Jersey

Roads 
Bayshore Boulevard in Tampa, Florida, United States
Bayshore Freeway, the name of a segment of US Route 101 in California
The Bayshore Route of Shuto Expressway, a stretch of toll highway in Greater Tokyo, Japan

Facilities 
Canada:
Bayshore Shopping Centre, Ottawa, Ontario
Bayshore station (Ottawa), transit bus terminal in Ottawa
Harry Lumley Bayshore Community Centre, Owen Sound, Ontario

Singapore
Bayshore MRT station, a future station in Singapore

United States:
Bayshore station (Caltrain), rail station near San Francisco, California
Bayshore Community Hospital, Holmdel, New Jersey
Bayshore Town Center, retail complex in Glendale, Wisconsin

Broadcasting
Bayshore Broadcasting Corporation, a radio station group owner in Ontario, Canada

See also
Bay Shore (disambiguation)